Judy and Punch is a 2019 Australian black comedy film written and directed by Mirrah Foulkes in her feature film directorial debut. It stars Mia Wasikowska, Damon Herriman, Tom Budge, Benedict Hardie, Gillian Jones, Terry Norris, Brenda Palmer and Lucy Velik.

It had its world premiere at the Sundance Film Festival on 27 January 2019. It was released in Australia on 21 November 2019, by Madman Entertainment and in the United States on 5 June 2020, by Samuel Goldwyn Films.

Plot
Judy and Punch are puppeteers in the town of Seaside, England who, alongside their baby daughter, are attempting to bring their marionette show back into the public eye. Judy wins the crowd with her puppetry but Punch suffers from a drinking problem. While chasing a little dog that has stolen a string of sausages, Punch trips and accidentally throws their baby out a high window killing her. Judy is incredulous when Punch casually admits to dropping their baby out a window, then she punches him, and he retaliates with a fire poker, beating her.

Punch believes he has killed Judy, hides her body, reports the crime to the local constable, and implicates their two elderly servants, Scaramouche and Maude, who had raised Judy since she was a child. Maude and Scaramouche are arrested and Punch tells the whole town of their guilt of murder and subsequent cannibalism of his daughter.

Judy is found unconscious and taken to live in a secret society of outcasts in the forest. When she recovers she swears vengeance on Punch, part of which is terrorising him, including by visiting Punch in their house with a large puppet representing a ghost that demands he repent and clear the name of the falsely accused couple or a worse fate will come to him.

On the hanging scaffold, Punch appears to recant, saying that the pair are not guilty, but he continues his speech saying that it is not they but the Devil who is guilty and who is being dealt with by the hanging and he works the crowd into a bloodlust. However, when he pulls the trapdoor lever, the pair fall to the ground as their ropes have been cut. Judy and the forest troupe arrive. Punch is lassoed about each wrist and hung from the scaffold while Judy approaches him with a large axe, saying serious crime deserves serious punishment, and she cuts his hands off.

Some while later, Judy is seen living at her house with her companions. Punch is confined to an insane asylum where he puts on a mad Punch and Judy puppet show watched through the window by a few people on the street outside.

Cast

Production
In October 2017, it was announced Mia Wasikowska had joined the cast of the film, with Mirrah Foulkes directing from a screenplay she wrote. In April 2018, Damon Herriman joined the cast of the film.

Release
The film had its world premiere at the Sundance Film Festival on 27 January 2019. Shortly after, Samuel Goldwyn Films acquired U.S. distribution rights to the film. It was released in Australia on 21 November 2019, and is scheduled to be released in the United States on 5 June 2020.

Reception
Judy and Punch received positive reception from critics. The site's critical consensus reads, "Judy & Punch revisits classic characters from a fresh perspective, marking debuting writer-director Mirrah Foulkes as a filmmaking talent to watch." On Metacritic, the film has a weighted average rating of 59 out of 100, based on 23 critics, indicating "mixed or average reviews".

Accolades

References

External links
 
 

2019 films
2019 black comedy films
2010s feminist films
Australian black comedy films
Australian films about revenge
Samuel Goldwyn Films films
2010s English-language films